The Federacja Polskiej Przedsiębiorczości (lit. "Federation of Polish Entrepreneurship", FPP) was a political party in Poland.

History
The party was established as the Christian Labour Party (Chrześcijańska Partia Pracy, ChPP) on 31 March 1990 by representatives of small businesses. It was part of the Christian Democracy alliance for the 1991 parliamentary elections. The alliance won five seats in the Sejm, with Józef Hermanowicz and Henryk Rospara of the ChPP becoming MPs.

In 1993 the party was renamed Federacja Polskiej Przedsiębiorczości. It was part of the Catholic Electoral Committee "Homeland" alliance for the 1993 parliamentary elections, but the alliance failed to win any seats. In the late 1990s it became closely aligned with the Movement for Reconstruction of Poland.

References

Defunct political parties in Poland
Political parties established in 1990
1990 establishments in Poland